Tlon or TLON may refer to:

 "Tlön, Uqbar, Orbis Tertius" (1940), a short story by Argentine writer Jorge Luis Borges.
 The Legend of Neil, a parody web series of the Nintendo game The Legend of Zelda.
 Tlon Inc., Curtis Yarvin's startup developing the Urbit computing platform.